The participation of women and girls in sports, physical fitness and exercise, has been recorded to have existed throughout history. However, participation rates and activities vary in accordance with nation, era, geography, and stage of economic development. While initially occurring informally, the modern era of organized sports did not begin to emerge either for men or women until the late industrial age.

Until roughly 1870, women's activities tended to be informal and recreational in nature, lacked rules codes, and emphasized physical activity rather than competition. Today, women's sports are more sport-specific and have developed into both amateur levels of sport and professional levels in various places internationally, but is found primarily within developed countries where conscious organization and accumulation of wealth has occurred. In the mid-to-latter part of the 20th century, female participation in sport and the popularization of their involvement increased, particularly during its last quarter. Very few organized sports have been invented by women. Sports such as Newcomb ball, netball, acrobatic gymnastics and tumbling, and possibly stoolball, are examples. More recent examples include Pamela Frey's sport of BasKua in Argentina, and the game of Crokicurl by Liz Wreford and Leanne Muir in Canada.

Women's involvement in sports is more visible in well-developed countries and today their level of participation and performance still varies greatly by country and by sport. Despite an increase in women's participation in sport, the male demographic is still the larger of the two. These demographic differences are observed globally. Female dominated sports are the one exception. Girls' participation in sports tend to be higher in the United States than in other parts of the world like Western Europe and Latin America. Girls' participation in more violent contact sports is far less than that of their male counterparts.

Two important divisions exist in relation to female sporting categories. These sports either emerged exclusively as an organized  female sport or were developed as an organized female variant of a sport first popularized by a male demographic and therefore became a female category. In all but a few exceptional cases, such as in the case of camogie, a female variant, or "women's game" uses the same name of the sport popularly played by men, but is classified into a different category which is differentiated by sex: men's or women's, or girls or boys. Female variants are widely common while organized female sports by comparison are rare and include team sports such as netball, throwball, artistic (née synchronized) swimming, and ringette. In female sports, the supposed benefits of gender parity, gender equity, and gender equality feminism are controversial. Men dominate the top elite spots in the vast majority of sports worldwide due to their biological advantages and the deliberate exclusion of male athletes prevents male participants from dominating for that reason. The conscious exclusion of male athletes from female sports has enabled them to produce an elite level of female athletes rather than male. In addition, female sports provide women and girls with a unique advantage by affording them the opportunity to feature as the sport's primary athletes rather than have to compete with males for attention, an achievement undermined by the inclusion of males. The Canadian sport of ringette, created in 1963, is the last team sport in history to have been created exclusively for the female sex.

Except in a few rare cases like women's professional tennis, professional women's sport rarely provide competitors with a livable income. In addition, competing for media coverage of the women's variant of a sport which is primarily popular among males, creates complex barriers. More recently, there has been an increasing amount of interest, research, investment and production in regards to equipment design for female athletes. Interest and research involving the identification of sex-specific injuries, particularly though not exclusively among high performance female athletes, has increased as well, such as in the case of concussions and the female athlete triad,  "Relative energy deficiency in sport", (RED-S).

At times female athletes have engaged in social activism in conjunction with their participation in sport. Protest methods have included playing strikes, social media campaigns, and in the case of America, federal lawsuits on grounds of inequality, usually as it relates to gender parity principles, American law and Title IX. Public service oriented promotional campaigns for girls in sport involve a variety of media campaign styles.

History

Ancient civilizations

Before each ancient Olympic Games a separate women's athletic event was held at the stadium in Olympia, called the Heraean Games and was dedicated to the goddess Hera. In ancient Greek mythology there was the belief that Heraea was founded by Hippodameia, the wife of the king who founded the Olympics. According to E. Norman Gardiner:

Although married women were excluded from the Olympics even as spectators, Cynisca won an Olympic game as owner of a chariot (champions of chariot races were owners not riders), as did Euryleonis, Belistiche, Zeuxo, Encrateia and Hermione, Timarete, Theodota and Kassia.

After the classical period, there was some participation by women in men's athletic festivals. Women in Sparta began to practice the same athletic exercises that men did, exhibiting the qualities of Spartan soldiers. Plato even supported women in sports by advocating running and sword-fighting for women.

Notably, cultural representations of a pronounced female physicality were not limited to sport in Ancient Greece and can also be found in representations of a group of warrioresses known as the Amazons.

Early modern
During the Song, Yuan, and Ming dynasties, women played in professional Cuju teams.

Modern era

Late 17th century

The educational committees of the French Revolution (1789) included intellectual, moral, and physical education for both girls and boys. With the victory of Napoleon less than twenty years later, physical education was reduced to military preparedness for boys and men. In Germany, the physical education of GutsMuths (1793) included girl's education. This included the measurement of performances of girls. This led to women's sport being more actively pursued in Germany than in most other countries. When the Fédération Sportive Féminine Internationale was formed as an all women's international organization it had a German male vice-president in addition to German international success in elite sports.

19th and early 20th centuries

Few women competed in sports in Europe and North America before the late nineteenth and early twentieth centuries. Although women were technically permitted to participate in many sports, relatively few did. Those who did participate often faced disapproval. Early women's professional sports leagues during the early part of the 20th century foundered.

Women's sports in the late 1800s focused on correct posture, facial and bodily beauty, muscles, and health. Prior to 1870, activities for women were recreational rather than sport-specific in nature and emphasized physical activity rather than competition. Sports for women before the 20th century placed more emphasis on fitness rather than the competitive aspects we now associate with organized sports.

In 1916 the Amateur Athletic Union (AAU) held its first national championship for women (in swimming), In 1923 the AAU also sponsored the First American Track & Field championships for women. Earlier that year the Women's Amateur Athletic Association (WAAA) held the first WAAA Championships.

Bicycling became a popular activity among women in the suffragette era. "Bicycling has done more to emancipate women than anything else in the world," Susan B. Anthony said. "I stand and rejoice every time I see a woman ride on a wheel. It gives women a feeling of freedom and self-reliance."

The Olympics and women

The first Olympic games in the modern era in 1896 were not open to women. Since then the number of women who have participated in the Olympic games have increased substantially.

The modern Olympics had female competitors from 1900 onward, though women at first participated in considerably fewer events than men. Women first made their appearance in the Olympic Games in Paris in 1900. That year, 22 women competed in tennis, sailing, croquet, equestrian, and golf. The International Olympic Committee founder Pierre de Coubertin described women's sports "impractical, uninteresting, unaesthetic, and we are not afraid to add: incorrect". However, the 6th IOC Congress in Paris 1914 decided that a woman's medal had formally the same weight as a man's in the official medal table. This left the decisions about women's participation to the individual international sports federations. Concern over the physical strength and stamina of women led to the discouragement of female participation in more physically strenuous sports.

In response to the lack of support for women's international sport the Fédération Sportive Féminine Internationale was founded in France by Alice Milliat. This organization initiated the Women's Olympiad (held 1921, 1922 and 1923) and the Women's World Games, which attracted participation of nearly 20 countries and was held four times (1922, 1926, 1930 and 1934). In 1924 the 1924 Women's Olympiad was held at Stamford Bridge in London. The International Olympic Committee began to incorporate greater participation of women at the Olympics in response. The number of Olympic women athletes increased over five-fold in the period, going from 65 at the 1920 Summer Olympics to 331 at the 1936 Summer Olympics.

Amateur competitions became the primary venue for women's sports. Throughout the mid-twentieth century, Communist countries dominated many Olympic sports, including women's sports, due to state-sponsored athletic programs that were technically regarded as amateur.  The legacy of these programs endured, as former Communist countries continue to produce many of the top female athletes. Germany and Scandinavia also developed strong women's athletic programs in this period.

20th Century United States to the present

Implementation and regulation of Title IX

Overview

In 1972 the United States Congress passed the Title IX legislation as a part of the additional Amendment Act to the 1964 Civil Rights Act. Title IX states that: "no person shall on the basis of sex, be excluded from participating in, be denied benefits of, or be subjected to discrimination under any educational programs or activities receiving federal financial assistance"; Title IX prohibits discrimination based on sex in schools receiving federal funds through grants, scholarships, or other support for students. The law states that federal funds can be withdrawn from a school engaging in intentional sex-based discrimination in the provision of curriculum, counseling, academic support, or general educational opportunities.

Contrary to popular belief, Title IX initially had nothing to do with sports and would not include interscholastic or varsity sports until later. Today the law from the Education Act requires that both male and female athletes have equal facilities and equal benefits. The equal benefits are considered necessities such as equal equipment, uniforms, supplies, training, practice, quality in coaches and opponents, awards, cheerleaders and bands at the game.

Important changes regarding athletics and sport occurred in 1975:

In 1979, there was a policy interpretation that offered three ways in which schools could be compliant with Title IX in regards to athletics and sport; it became known as the "three-part test".

 Providing athletic participation opportunities that are substantially proportionate to the student enrollment. This prong of the test is satisfied when participation opportunities for men and women are "substantially proportionate" to their respective undergraduate enrollment.
 Demonstrating a continual expansion of athletic opportunities for the underrepresented sex. This prong of the test is satisfied when an institution has a history and continuing practice of program expansion that is responsive to the developing interests and abilities of the underrepresented sex (typically female).
 Accommodating the interest and ability of the underrepresented sex. This prong of the test is satisfied when an institution is meeting the interests and abilities of its female students even where there are disproportionately fewer females than males participating in sports.

Schools only have to be compliant with one of the three prongs.

Compliance standards

A 1999 study by Sigelman and Wahlbeck found many schools were "nowhere near compliance". Many schools attempt to achieve compliance through the first prong; however, in order to achieve that compliance schools cut men's programs, which is not the way the OCR wanted compliance achieved. Equity is not the only way to be compliant with Title IX; athletic departments need to show that they are making efforts to achieve parity in participation, treatment, and athletic financial assistance.

According to research done by the National Women's Law Center in 2011, 4500 public high schools across the nation exhibited high rates of gender inequality and were considered to be in violation of the Title IX laws. Further research done by the Women's Law Center in 2017 found schools with a high number of minority students and a higher number of people of color, mainly found in the southern American states, had a much higher rate of gender disparity. A large disparity gap regarding sport-related scholarships for men and women, with men getting 190 million more in funding than women, was also found. Despite an increase in participation in sports by girls and women, this pattern persists. Most colleges focus on their male athletics teams and invest more money into those already successful programs. This disparity is presented by some feminist ideologues as a phenomenon illustrating a cause and effect link between race and gender, and how it plays a significant role in the hierarchy of sports.

Effect of Title IX on women's sports
It is widely believed that Title IX has had a positive effect on women's sports in America and aided their participation. American female athletes now have grounds to help support the stance that women athletes deserve a higher level of respect and consideration that is necessary in order for their participation. Women's involvement in sports has helped raise the recognition of their sports programs and competitive athletes to a level comparable to that which men have enjoyed for many years.

While the mandate did not immediately go into effect it had been publicized to such an extent that it enabled the general public to sense its future implications. There had been great anticipation for the bill prior to its passage which helped it gain media coverage in time for when the bill was mandated to be followed.

Post Title IX

The involvement in women's sports spiked after Title IX was put into place, mostly in high school level sports as well as collegiate.
Title IX's effect on women in sport was observed to have far reaching implications that were not restricted to those who were participating in a professional or intermediate way. Girls and women who did not see themselves in a more "serious athlete" light felt increasingly empowered to participate and compete.

The bill allowed for the equal treatment of female athletes to become a part of the larger sports institution and culture and is considered to have played an important role in increasing the popular view in America that female participation and competition in sport was a valid part of society and life.

Participation in America 

Title IX is American law. The purpose of the Title IX of the Educational Amendments of 1972 was to update Title VII of the Civil Rights Act of 1964, which banned several forms of discrimination in employment but did not address or mention discrimination in education. Contrary to popular belief, the creation of Title IX had nothing to do with sports. Women's sports were not considered a relevant issue within educational organizations at the time. It wasn't until later that Title IX involved a new objective to ensure equal treatment in organized sports and schools regardless of sex, in a federally funded program. However, Title IX is most commonly associated with its impact on American athletics and more specifically the impact it has had on women's participation in athletics at every age.

Since Title IX became law, records have illustrated an increasing number of opportunities in American educational institutions in a variety of sports for women and girls. As of the 2007–2008 school year, females made up 41% of the participants in college athletics. In 1971–1972 there were 294,015 females participating in high school athletics and in 2007–2008 there were over three million females participating, a 940% increase in female participation in high school athletics. In 1971–1972 there were 29,972 females participating in college athletics and in 2007–2008 there were 166,728 females participating, a 456% increase in female participation in college athletics. In 1971, less than 300,000 females played in high school sports. After the law was passed many females started to get involved in sports. By 1990, eighteen years later, 1.9 million female high school students were playing sports.

American studies have investigated whether or not there is a strong correlation between female participation in sport and positive outcomes in women's education and employment later on in life. A 2010 study found that the changes set in motion by Title IX explained about 20 percent of the increase in women's education and about 40 percent of the rise in employment for 25-to-34-year-old women. This is not to say that all women who are successful later on in life played sports, but it is saying that women who did participate in athletics received benefits in their education and employment later on in life.

In 1971, fewer than 295,000 girls participated in high school varsity athletics, accounting for just 7 percent of all varsity athletes; in 2001, that number leaped to 2.8 million, or 41.5 percent of all varsity athletes, according to the National Coalition for Women and Girls in Education. In 1966, 16,000 females competed in intercollegiate athletics. By 2001, that number jumped to more than 150,000, accounting for 43 percent of all college athletes. In addition, a 2008 study of intercollegiate athletics showed that women's collegiate sports had grown to 9,101 teams, or 8.65 per school. The five most frequently offered college sports for women in America are, in order: (1) basketball, 98.8% of schools have a team, (2) volleyball, 95.7%, (3) soccer, 92.0%, (4) cross country, 90.8%, and (5) softball, 89.2%. Since 1972, women have also competed in the traditional male sports of wrestling, weightlifting, rugby, and boxing. An article in the New York Times reported lasting benefits for women from Title IX, citing a correlation between participation in sports and increased educational opportunities as well as employment opportunities for girls. Furthermore, the athletic participation by girls and women spurred by Title IX was associated with lower obesity rates while other public health program failed to claim similar success.

Participation in leadership roles 

Although female participation in sports has increased due to Title IX, there has not been a similar effect in terms of women holding coaching or other managerial positions in sports. Most sport teams or institutions, regardless of gender, are managed by male coaches and managers. For example, according to 2016 data, 33% of WNBA teams are led by women coaches or managers. The International Olympic Committee also consists of 20% female members. The data presented also showed that 15% of athletic directors in colleges nationwide were females, and that number is much less in the southern states. There are various reasons that have been suggested to account for this trend. Messner and Bozada-Deas (2009) suggest traditional gender roles may play a role and that society's historical division of labor leads to men volunteering as team coaches and women volunteering as team "moms". Everhart and Chelladurai (1998) show that this phenomenon may be part of a larger cycle --- girls who are coached by men growing up are less likely to view themselves as coaches when they are adults, and so the number of female coaches decreases, meaning more girls are coached by men.

Canada

Organized sports hold a high priority status in Canadian culture, The growth of female participation in sport in Canada has historically been slower than that among males. One notable exception is the female sport of ringette, which is not a variant of a popular men's sport and whose players are predominantly female. Different arguments exist as to why there are less female participants in sport in Canada and what factors are and should be considered most relevant.

Academic prejudice

In most cases, Canadian studies involving female participation in sport fail to involve methodologies that account for and make observable the difference between participation rates in exclusively or predominantly female sports such as artistic (née synchronized) swimming and ringette in comparison to sports involving male and female categories of the same sport, such as basketball. Popular prejudice against sports which are mainly popular among females is often exacerbated by gender equity feminists whose goal it is to portray female sports excellence as merited only within the context of competition with men. As a result, sports which involve both a male and female category are viewed as legitimately successful due to the manufactured struggle between the two sexes, despite the reality of male dominance in sport due to natural biological assets.

Canadian feminists in sport
In Canada, the majority of feminist ideologues in sport claim slow growth in participation in girls' and women's sports programs (with male and female categories) are due to a number of factors. While both girls and women have historically had low levels of interest and participation, sports feminists in Canada have contended that these differences are largely due to patriarchy and the fact that there are fewer women than men in leadership positions in academic administration, student affairs, athletics, and coaching.

In Canada as well as in other societies worldwide, organized sports have been used and viewed as a traditional way to demonstrate and develop masculinity. With an increasing number of girls and women with a serious interest in sports, the cross-cultural divide between the sexes began to narrow with the male sports establishment becoming actively hostile. During the 1960s with the arrival of second wave feminism, a number of feminists dismissed female sports and thought of them as an unworthy cause and one in no need of their support.

Among other feminists, women's progress in sport involved the belief that their needed to be an effort to counter a common and unfounded notion that vigorous physical activity was dangerous for women. These notions where first challenged around 1900. These women, called, "new women", started with bicycling. By the 1920s, a marked change for women occurred involving young working-class women in addition to the pioneering middle class sportswomen. However, more recent scientific research in the sport sciences, particularly sports medicine have shown differences between men and women in terms of types of sports injuries, their rate of occurrence, and injury recovery times. Female athletes participating in contact and combat sports are an area of particular concern, especially in the case of concussions. Concern also involves consequences to women during pregnancy.

Differences in codes

Historically, regional differences in Canada are recorded to have existed in regards to codified rules in sport involving male and female programs. One such example involves the Eastern provinces of Canada which for a time included a different game code for the female category of basketball, while the Western provinces opted for a simplified identical rules structure in relation to both sexes. This disparity is claimed as evidence of sexism among the more radical feminist polemicists in Canadian sport.

First elite all-female winter team sports league 

Canada is home to the first elite all-female winter team sports league in North America, the National Ringette League (NRL). The league was established for the sport of ringette in Canada in 2004. The league recruits the best ringette talent in North America, largely from Canada, but some players originate from Finland or the United States. The league's players are unpaid as the league is not a professional one and acts as a showcase league instead.

Ringette was created exclusively for females in Canada in 1963 and excluded male athletes. As a result, the elite level of the sport consists entirely of players who are women. Because the sport has developed a female category, and a male category does not exist, the league has no opportunity to form a partnership with a male league counterpart. However, it does not have to compete with the men's sports leagues themselves, unlike professional women's soccer leagues, the Women's National Basketball Association (WNBA) which must contend with the men's NBA or the North American women's Premier Hockey Federation (formerly the National Women's Hockey League or NWHL) which must contend with the men's NHL.

Germany

Female athletic dominance grew during the Weimar period in Germany with several factors contributing to this new era. Many opportunities made it possible for women to join sports programs and push boundaries within society. These included the enrollment of women in German universities, the rise in female employment, as well as involvement in war industries. All of these are examples of economic changes due to World War I. Women's fashion reflected the changes that women perceived in themselves. Women's magazines showed them in sporting outfits as they were motivated to create an appearance that featured them as healthy and fit. The same women were known at night in more fashionable outfits, displaying femininity. Women were becoming more competitive in sport. The competitive sports that women began participating in, included swimming, ski-jumping, and soccer. Participation in masculine sports including boxing and weightlifting, drew the attention of the press. The growing participation of women in sport also sparked a rise in satirical exaggerations of women that downplayed their role in the athletic world. Pictures of women in sporting attire were produced with the intention of publicizing a negative image of their bodies as a consequence of their participation in sport. As issues surrounding women's sexuality began to grow in the public sphere,  women also gained more publicity and attention in relationship to their place in sports.

United Kingdom

The United Kingdom has produced a range of major international sports including: association football, rugby (union and league), cricket, netball, darts, golf, tennis, table tennis, badminton, squash, bowls, rounders, modern rowing, field hockey, boxing, snooker, billiards, and curling. In the 19th century, women primarily participated in the "new games" which included golf, lawn tennis, cycling, and field hockey. Now, women also participate at a professional/international level in soccer, rugby, cricket, and netball.

Since the late 1980s, Women in Sport, a non-profit organization based in London, has hoped to transform sport for the benefit of women and girls in the UK.

The Henley Royal Regatta, more recently allowed women to compete at this prestigious rowing race. Although the benefits that men receive at this race versus what women receive is still drastically different, there is progress within allowing women to compete competitively.

1960s to 2010s

In the early 1800s women romped, skated, played ball games and some even boxed. The early half of the 1900s saw an increase in interest in regards to the development of physical education programs for public schools for both sexes as well as developing public recreation programming and facilities ( parks and recreation) which became a new emerging field.

After the civil war wealthy women started playing country club sports such as golf.

Beginning in the 1970s, women's tennis grew as a popular professional sport and provided the occasion for a symbolic "battle of the sexes" between Billie Jean King and Bobby Riggs, which King won. However, due to the age of Riggs who was also out of shape, the contest was strictly for show. Nevertheless, the competition gained media popular media exposure thus enhancing the profile of female athletics.

The later success of Serena and Venus Williams helped raise the profile of women's tennis again, but faced hostility once in the media spotlight. They were critiqued for their personal upbringings, their muscular builds, and the clothes they wore. James McKay and Helen Johnson described them as "Ghetto Cinderellas".

Women's professional team sports began to achieve prominence in the 1990s, particularly in basketball and football (soccer). The WNBA was formed and the first Women's World Cups and women's Olympic soccer matches were held.

In 1999, at the 1999 FIFA Women's World Cup Final in Pasadena, California, after scoring the fifth kick in the penalty shootout to give the United States the win over China in the final game, Brandi Chastain celebrated by spontaneously taking off her jersey and falling to her knees in a sports bra. While removing a jersey in celebration of a goal was common in men's soccer, it was highly unusual in women's football at the international level. The image of her celebration has been considered one of the more famous and controversial photographs of a woman celebrating an athletic victory. In 2019, it was announced that a statue of Chastain's celebration would be displayed at the Rose Bowl to commemorate the twenty-year anniversary of the team's win.

Girls' participation in more violent contact sports is far less than their male counterparts. In sports of these type, boys overwhelmingly outnumber girls, particularly football, wrestling, and boxing.

Leagues for girls do exist in such sports such as the Utah Girls Football League and Professional Girl Wrestling Association. Katie Hnida became the first woman ever to score points in a Division I NCAA American football game when she kicked two extra points for the University of New Mexico in 2003.

Heather Watson and Fu Yuanhui were considered to have challenged a taboo in women's sport when both openly admitted they were menstruating, Watson after a self-described poor performance in a tennis match in 2015, and Fu at the Olympics in Rio de Janeiro.

Female sports

"Female sports" are rare and have been created specifically for the female sex and are not variants of popular men's sports. While sports which involve female participation are often collectively called, "women's sports", the overwhelming majority are not, and are in fact  "female variants"  "the female equivalent" of sports which were first played by and popularized by men and boys, making these two sporting groups distinct. Some female sports can be traced back to a single inventor while others cannot and are difficult to identify. Some female sports are or can be attributed to a variety of individuals who helped contribute to its early development instead. Below is a list of female sports.

Professional sports

Overview 

Professional sports refers to sports in which athletes are paid for their performance. Opportunities for women to play professional sports vary by country. Some women's professional sports leagues are directly affiliated with a men's professional sports league like the WNBA. Others are independently owned and operated like the Premier Hockey Federation, formerly the National Women's Hockey League.

While women today do have the opportunity to play professional sports, the pay for women's professional sports is significantly lower than it is in men's professional sports. An American feminist theory known as the gender pay gap in sports is an attempt to explain the causes behind these differences.

It isn't uncommon for professional athletes hold second jobs in order to supplement their income due to low salary. Female professional athletes often play in smaller lower-quality facilities than male professional athletes due to low attendance. Women's professional sports are rarely broadcast regularly on live television. New developments in digital technology have created an opportunity for female leagues to live-stream competitions and events on social media platforms such as Twitter or Twitch instead.

Women face increasing challenges once they look to enter the business side of sports. Some research suggests that women occupy leadership positions in the sports industry at a lower rate than men however, the majority of these are positions are in men's professional sports rather than women's. When women do occupy the same positions as men, they may be paid less, although some research has shown revenue-specific variables may be more relevant than gender-specific variables when examining compensation levels.

Although several professional women's sports leagues have been established throughout the world in the post-Title IX era, they are generally behind in terms of exposure, funding, and attendance compared to the men's teams. However, there are notable exceptions. The 2015 Women's World Cup final was the most-watched soccer game ever in the United States. And in 2017, Portland Thorns FC of the NWSL had higher average attendance than several men's professional teams, including 15 NBA teams, 13 NHL teams, and 1 MLB team. The Thorns' 2019 season saw an even higher average attendance of 20,098. This was higher than all but one of the 30 NBA teams in the 2018–19 season, all but three of the 31 NHL teams in the 2018–19 season, 15 of the 24 MLS teams in the 2019 season, and 6 of the 30 MLB teams in the 2019 season.

Active women's professional leagues and associations

Battle for equality

Equal representation in organized sport for girls and women is commonly referred to as the "battle for equality" and includes a variety of competing feminist ideologies. Worldwide, the dominant representative sex in sport is male both financially and globally except in the rare case of sports created specifically for girls and women and certain sport disciplines. Sports dominated by women instead of men are few and the majority of organized sports dubbed "women's sports" or the "women's game" were created as the female equivalent of sports which were first popularized by men and male athletes. Over time there have been gradual and increasing efforts by different groups, individuals and lobbies in different countries to find ways which enable women to gain equal representation and support like their male counterparts. This change can be witnessed at the national level in different countries and in women's professional leagues. In terms of finding ways to acquire better pay and better funding, efforts largely began in the 20th century. A significant historical marker occurred during the 2012 London Olympics where it became the first Olympic games in which women competed in every sport.

In some areas, sex and gender can serve as a selective and primary factor in terms of determining if women's sports should receive the same treatment as men's. Whether or not women are as able-bodied as men can serve as the basis of decision making criteria. Gender-based characteristics associated with masculinity and femininity can become the deciding factor for individuals in terms of their potential sports participation, but can also affect organizing sporting bodies where this has been held as a justifiable dismissal of sports equity for female participants.

Although there are various goals and reasons behind organized team sports participation in Western cultures, one perspective claims that sport is principally organized around the political project of physically and symbolically elevating men over women. One study has claimed that notions of audience interest or preference were based on personal beliefs and assumptions rather than evidence or research and that in some cases these beliefs and assumptions were the reason why coverage of men's professional sports is prioritized.

Pay gap

The pay gap in women sports is a controversial issue. Women athletes, in their respective sports, are often paid far less than their male counterparts. The difference between the American men's and women's soccer teams' salaries has been used as an example regarding pay inequality.  Women on the U.S national team earned $99,000 per year, while men earned $263,320 if they were to win 20 exhibition matches. There is a substantial gap in rewards in regards to winning the FIFA World Cup. The German men's national team earned 35 million dollars, while the American women's national team earned 2 million dollars after winning the World Cup. The battle in equality for fair pay divulges in to other sports in which men earn far more than women. Golf is another sport which has a significant rising female presence. In 2014, the PGA Tour awarded US$340 million in prize money for men's tournaments, compared to 62 million dollars awarded to the LPGA Tour. Basketball is another sport which has surged in popularity in the last few decades and has significant female presence. In the United States, the NBA organizes top-level professional basketball competition for both sexes, with men playing in the NBA proper and women in the WNBA. As of 2021, a WNBA player's minimum salary is $57,000, while an NBA player's minimum salary is $898,310. An average NBA player makes over $5 million while an average WNBA player makes $72,000. In September 2018, the World Surf League announced equal pay for both male and female athletes for all events, contributing to the conversation in the world of professional sports surrounding equality.

Social media
The advent of social media has had a positive impact on women's sports by providing more platforms for advertising and conversation. It has created more opportunities to increase the promotion of women's sports and helped form the establishment of communities both online and offline around women's and girls sports, including access to women's sports news. This pattern is expected to continue into the future and has been presented as a powerful tool to help offset the issues of gender bias and other disparities.

Australia

In September 2015, the Australian women's national soccer team (nicknamed the Matildas) announced that it had canceled a sold-out tour of the United States due to a dispute with the Football Federation of Australia (FFA) over their pay. Their salary was below minimum wage levels in Australia. The Matildas requested health care, maternity leave, and improved travel arrangements, as well as an increased salary. The players also said that their low salaries forced them to remain living at home, since they could not afford rent, and their strict training schedule meant they were unable to get another job.

In September 2017, a new pay deal was announced for players in Australia's national soccer league, the W-League. The deal included an increase in wages, an increase in the salary cap, improved medical standards, and a formal maternity policy. Some commentators have attributed the success of the new W-League deal to the Matildas' boycott in 2015.

In November 2019, the FFA announced a new contract with the union Professional Footballers Australia (PFA) in which the Matildas and the men's national team (the Caltex Socceroos) will receive equal shares of total player revenue and equal resources. In addition, the guaranteed minimum salary for a player on the Matildas will increase as a result of this deal.

China

One of the earliest examples of women's sports in modern China was Qiu Jin. Qiu Jin, a Chinese revolutionary during the late 1800s and early 1900s, trained women to be soldiers alongside men in sports societies. They were taught fencing, riding, and gymnastics. According to Susan Bronwell, the most important moment for women's sports in China came in 1981 with a Chinese victory in the 1981 FIVB Women's World Cup in Tokyo, Japan. This victory made the female volleyball players household names in China, though the victory was portrayed as the work of leading male government officials like Ma Qiwei, He Long, and Zhou Enlai, who helped contribute at various stages to the success of the team. The victory symbolized a growth of women's sports in China after the Cultural Revolution of the 1960s and 1970s, wherein many athletes were suppressed:

Contemporary Chinese sports teams are noted for their wide breadth of participation by female athletes, specifically in the Olympic Games. A Herfindahl Index (a measure often used in economics to show the degree of concentration when individuals are classified by type, and a lower number indicates higher diversity) showing Female Participation in the 2012 Olympics indicated China's female Olympic delegation, the fourth largest present, to be the second most spread out across all events at 0.050, compared to higher numbers from over 190 other delegations. The same index showed the ratio of women to men to be 7 to 10. 213 total female athletes participated. In total, approximately 60% of Chinese Olympic gold medals were earned by female athletes over the last 8 Olympic games. Challenges to equality remain such as media representation. According to Yu Chia Chen, female Asian athletes receive much less coverage than their male counterparts. Another report indicates Chinese girls and women are also less likely to be exposed to sports programming on television.

Ireland
In October 2017, the Irish Rugby Football Union (IRFU) advertised an available position for head coach of the Irish women's national rugby team. The job was advertised as "part-time", "casual", and available on six-month basis. Players expressed their disagreement with the decision, believing it was a sign that the IRFU was disrespecting and not prioritizing the women's game. In response to this announcement, the players highlighted what they perceived as the IRFU's lack of commitment to the long-term development of the women's game by wearing bracelets with "#Legacy" written on them for games with their club teams in the All Ireland League.

Jamaica
The Jamaican women's national soccer team (nicknamed the Reggae Girlz) participated in the 2019 FIFA Women's World Cup. This was the first Women's World Cup the country had qualified for, and the country was also the first Caribbean country to ever qualify. However, in September 2019, members of the team, including Khadija Shaw and Allyson Swaby, posted a graphic on Instagram with captions stating that they had not been paid by the Jamaica Football Federation (JFF) for nine months of work. They announced that the team would not participate in any future tournaments until they received payment. JFF President Michael Ricketts later announced that the team would be paid by the end of September. In October 2019, the Reggae Girlz began playing again, and they won their group in the Qualification Tournament for the 2020 CONCACAF Women's Olympic Qualifying Competition.

The Jamaican national netball team (nicknamed the Sunshine Girls) is ranked fourth in the world, as of July 2019. However, the team has not been well-funded, and had to resort to crowdfunding to attend the 2019 Netball World Cup. After receiving support from sponsors, the Sunshine Girls were able to go to the tournament, where they placed fifth overall.

Muslim world

Muslim women are less likely to take part in sport than Western non-Muslims. This is particularly so for women in Arab societies. The traditions of Islamic modesty in dress and requirements for women's sport to take place in a single-sex environment make sports participation more difficult for devout female adherents. The lack of availability of suitably modest sports clothing and sports facilities that allow women to play in private contributes to the lack of participation. Cultural norms of women's roles and responsibilities towards the family may also be a source of discouragement from time-consuming sports practice.

However, Islamic tenets and religious texts suggest that women's sports in general should be promoted and are not against the values of the religion. The Quranic statements that followers of Islam should be healthy, fit and make time for leisure are not sex-specific. The prophet Muhammad is said to have raced his wife Aisha on several occasions, with Aisha beating him the first couple of times. Correspondingly, some scholars have proposed that Muslim women's lack of engagement with sport is due to cultural or societal reasons, rather than strictly religious ones.

However, besides religious testaments, there are many barriers for Muslim women in relation to sports participation. A significant barrier to Muslim women's sports participation is bans on the Islamic headscarf, commonly known as the hijab. FIFA instituted such a ban in 2011, preventing the Iranian women's national football team from competing. They have since repealed the ban, but other organizations, including FIBA, maintain such regulations. At the same time, many Muslim female athletes have achieved significant success in athletic competitions. Some have also used sports towards their own empowerment, working for women's rights, education, and health and wellbeing.

Iranian women were banned from attending a volleyball game and an Iranian girl was arrested for attending a match. Iran was given the right to host the International Beach Volleyball tournament, and many Iranian women were looking forward to attending the event. However, when the women tried to attend the event, they were disallowed, and told it was forbidden to attend by the FIVB. The women took to social media to share their outrage; however the Federation of International Beach volleyball refuted the accusations, saying it was a misunderstanding. This is one of the instances of unfair treatment of women, trying to participate in supporting their teams in Iran.

In October 2018 Iran announced that, after 40 years, it would allow women to enter sport arenas. On September 22, 2019, the Iranian authorities assured FIFA that women would be able to attend the October qualifier of 2022 World Cup in Tehran, stated Gianni Infantino.

Nigeria
In 2016, the Nigerian women's national soccer team, known as the Super Falcons, won the 2016 Africa Women Cup of Nations. The players alleged that they had not received their earned bonuses from winning the tournament owed to them by the Nigeria Football Federation (NFF). The NFF promised that it would pay them, but said the "money [was] not readily available at the moment." In response, players engaged in a sit-in at their hotel as well as publicly demonstrated outside Nigeria's National Assembly.

In 2019, the Super Falcons participated in the 2019 Women's World Cup and were eliminated from the tournament in the Round of 16. Following their elimination, the players engaged in another sit-in at their hotel, refusing to leave Paris until the NFF paid them the bonuses and daily allowances they had earned both from the World Cup as well as from other matches played in 2016 and 2017.

Norway

Norwegian sports are shaped by the values associated with them. For example, aggression generally is associated with males and being personable, with females. However, in terms of Norwegian handball, a study done by the Norwegian School of Sports and Sciences shows that gender is disregarded when the sport is covered in the media. The same study revealed that Women's handball is covered and followed as equally if not more than the men's team. In contrast to international handball coverage, the Norwegian coverage of Men's and Women's handball are discussed in the media using the same or similar verbiage. While they are especially noticeable in handball, equality and opportunity in Norwegian sports is not limited to the handball. Many top-female athletes from a number of sports have come from Norway. The act of playing or coaching were described slightly differently but categorized as successful using similar terms despite the gender of the coach or the player.

Ada Hegerberg is a highly skilled and decorated Norwegian soccer player, having won numerous Champions League and Division 1 Féminine titles with French club Olympique Lyonnais. She also won the first-ever women's Ballon D'Or, a prestigious award given to the best soccer player in the world. However, in 2017, she stopped playing with the Norwegian national team, citing unequal pay and conditions between the women's team and the men's team as her reason for stepping away from the team. She said she would no longer play for the national team until she felt that it was more respected by the Norwegian Football Federation and the culture surrounding women's soccer had improved, which meant she did not participate in the high-profile 2019 FIFA Women's World Cup.

Philippines
The Magna Carta for Women in the Philippines (Republic Act No. 9710.) mandates equal participation of women in sports among other non-sports related provisions.

In the Philippines, basketball which is often referred to as the country's most popular sport is male-dominated although there are efforts to promote the sport to Filipino women. In 2020, the Women's National Basketball League became the country's first professional women's basketball league.

Prior attempts to provide female players to play competitive basketball included the semi-professional Women's Philippine Basketball League which ran from 1998 to 1999, and in 2008. In 3x3 basketball, the men's professional league the Philippine Basketball Association, organized the short-lived PBA Women's 3x3 which was controversial for its haircut rules which barred women from sporting a "boy's cut".

South Africa
Between 2004 and 2008, the previously highly successful South African women's national soccer team, known as Banyana Banyana, began to struggle on the field due to a lack of a permanent coach. Members of the South African Football Association (SAFA) attributed the declining quality of play to the players' "lack of femininity" (Engh 2010), and the players were instructed to take etiquette classes and maintain stereotypical feminine hairstyles, as well as wear more feminine uniforms while playing. In response, players threatened to strike unless they were able to return to their preferred styles of dress.

In 2018, Banyana Banyana was not paid the agreed-upon amount owed to them after qualifying for the 2018 Africa Women Cup of Nations (AWCON), and they protested by not returning their official national team uniforms. In January 2019, the team was again not paid their stipends and bonuses, despite finishing in second place at AWCON. They threatened to strike by not attending interviews or team practices, as well as not playing in a game against the Dutch national team. However, in May 2019, it was announced that Banyana Banyana would receive equal pay with the men's team heading into the 2019 FIFA Women's World Cup.

Sweden

In Sweden, public funds are mostly given to men's hockey and football, and the women's team are left without proper funding. In 2016, Al Jazeera published an article bringing the discrimination that female Swedish athletes face to light by mentioning the double standard put on female athletes in terms of having to work double and still not receive the recognition or pay of the men's teams. Sweden is recognized as being a feminist country, however the wage gap is significant between male and female athletes. In 2013, Swedish striker, Zlatan Ibrahimovic earned $16.7 million a year playing for Paris Saint-German, whereas Lotta Schellin who played for Lyon in France only earned $239,720. The wage gap is also evident among coaches. The difference in pay is evident in how male athletes and female athletes are able to spend their time between games. Women often have to work between training and games to make a living and to pay for their training camps, whereas men have that time to recuperate and relax; men also do not pay to attend training camps.

In August 2019, the Swedish women's national ice hockey team boycotted the team's training camp and the Five Nations Tournament. In a movement they called #FörFramtiden (in English, "For the Future"), all 43 players invited to camp cited lack of equal pay as well as various instances of poor treatment by Svenska Ishockeyförbundet (the Swedish Ice Hockey Association, or SIF) toward the national team, including, but not limited to:

 Team travel conditions – traveling by ferry instead of by plane to games; arriving to games one day before a tournament began, without accounting for time differences and jet lag
 Team uniforms – players are provided men's clothing by SIF, not women's clothing
 Nutrition – players are provided expired products
 Lack of development – players allege that SIF has not adequately created a program to foster development of women's hockey at the youth level

The Four Nations Cup, originally scheduled for November 2019, was canceled by SIF due to the players' dispute with the federation.

Following the boycott, it was announced in October 2019 that the players had reached a new agreement with the federation, and that the team will begin training in November 2019 and play in a tournament against Switzerland, Finland, and Germany in December 2019. The new deal includes terms guaranteeing performance-based bonuses and additional compensation.

United States

Women make up 54% of enrollment at 832 schools that responded to an NCAA gender equity study in 2000; however, females at these institutions only account for 41% of the athletes. Before Title IX, 90% of women's college athletic programs were run by women, but by 1992 the number dropped to 42% since Title IX requires that there are equal opportunities for both genders. Many of the issues today often revolve around the amount of money going into men's and women's sports. According to 2000–2001 figures, men's college programs still have many advantages over women's in the average number of scholarships (60.5%), operating expenses (64.5%), recruiting expenses (68.2%) and head coaching salaries (59.5%). Other forms of inequality are in the coaching positions. Before Title IX, women coached 90% of women's teams; in 1978 that percentage dropped to 58, and in 2004 it dropped even more to 44 percent. In 1972, women administered 90 percent of women's athletic programs, and in 2004 this fell to 19 percent. Also in 2004, 18 percent of all women's programs had no women administrators. In 2004, there were 3,356 administrative jobs in NCAA women's athletic programs and of those jobs, women held 35 percent of them.

The fight for equality extends to the wallet. On March 30, 2016, five players from the U.S. women's soccer team filed a federal complaint of wage discrimination against U.S. Soccer, the governing body that pays both the men's and women's team. The complaint argues that U.S. Soccer pays players on the women's team as little as forty percent of what it pays players on the men's team. This pay discrepancy exists despite the fact that the women's team has been much more successful in international competitions; the women's team has won four Olympic gold medals and three of the last five Women's World Cups, while the men's team has never won either of these competitions.  This case was largely dismissed with the judge noting that the women's team had been offered and rejected the same pay structure as the men's team.

World conferences

In 1994, the International Working Group on Women and Sport organized the first World Conference on Women and Sport in Brighton, United Kingdom, where the Brighton Declaration was published. The IWG hosted further world conferences every four years, with the result of the Windfoek Call for Action (1998), Montreal Tool Kit (2002) and Brighton Plus Helsinki 2014 Declaration (2014). The conferences pretend to "develop a sporting culture that enables and values the full involvement of women in every aspect of sport and physical activity", by "increas[ing] the involvement of women in sport at all levels and in all functions and roles".

Media coverage 

Media coverage for women's sports is significantly less than the coverage for men's sports. Substantial research indicates that women's sports and female athletes gain only a small fraction of sports media coverage worldwide. Research that has examined why this is the case suggested this can be attributed to three particular factors that govern sports newswork: the male-dominated sports newsroom, ingrained assumptions about readership, and the systematic, repetitive nature of sports news. In 1989, a study was conducted that recorded and compared the amount of media coverage of men and women's sports on popular sports commentary shows. Michael Messner and his team in 2010 analyzed three different two-week periods by recording the amount of time that the stories were on air and the content of the stories. After recording sports news and highlights, they wrote a quantitative description of what they saw and a qualitative description of the amount of time that story received.

Feminist patriarchal theory

More often than not, modern research in regards to media and women's sport is focused on comparing women's sport with men's sport. Gender feminists in particular consider the lower levels of media representation in women's sport cause for alarm though this view is not shared among all women in sport, with some circles concerned more about increasing female participation itself. While one group maintains that these two factors, participation and media exposure, are inextricably linked, others disagree with this view and do not consider a media agenda or goal to be of importance.

Modern research involving the feminist theory of patriarchy aimed at determining the cause of a perceived lack of media representation is based predominantly upon two driving assumptions: the theory of patriarchy as fact in every case, and the belief that participation in sport by females should also serve a type of feminist agenda in order to be valid.

Recent work

In America, recent work attributed this perceived lack of representation in women's sport to three particular factors that govern sports newswork: the "male-dominated sports newsroom", "ingrained assumptions about readership", and the "systematic, repetitive nature of sports news".

In 1989, a study was conducted that recorded and compared the amount of media coverage of men and women's sports on popular sports commentary shows. Michael Messner and his team in 2010 analyzed three different two-week periods by recording the amount of time that the stories were on air and the content of the stories. After recording sports news and highlights, they wrote a quantitative description of what they saw and a qualitative description of the amount of time that story received.

During that first year that the research was conducted in 1989, it was recorded that 5% of the sports segments were based on women's sports, compared to the 92% that were based on men's sports and the 3% that was a combination of both. In the late 1900s Women's Sports started to gain popularity in the media because of their talent in the Olympics. In 1999, women's sports coverage reached an all-time high when it was recorded at 8.7%. It maintained its higher percentages until it reached an all-time low in 2009, decreasing to 1.6%. The researchers also measured the amount of time that women's sports were reported in the news ticker, the strip that displays information at the bottom of most news broadcasts. When recorded in 2009, 5% of ticker coverage was based on women's sports, compared to the 95% that was based on men's sports. These percentages were recorded in order to compare the amount of media coverage for each gender.

When researching the actual amount of time that women's sports stories were mentioned, they focused specifically on differences between the National Basketball Association (NBA) and the Women's National Basketball Association. They recorded two different time periods: when they were in season and when they were off-season. The WNBA had 8 stories, totaling 5:31 minutes, during their season, which was less than the NBA, which had a total of 72 stories, totaling approximately 65:51 minutes. During the off-season, the WNBA did not receive any stories or time on the ticker, while the NBA received a total of 81, which were approximately 50:15 minutes. When compared, the WNBA had a total of 8 stories and 5:31 minutes while the NBA had 153 stories and 1:56:06 hours. A recent study showed that in July, -The NBA summer league receives more coverage and attention than a regular season game in the WNBA. The actual games had several differences in the way the games were presented. The findings were that WNBA games had lower sound quality, more editing mistakes, fewer views of the shot clock and fewer camera angles. There was less verbal commentary and visual statistics about the players throughout the games as well. The quality of the stories has also significantly changed. In past studies, women were sexualized, portrayed as violent, or portrayed as girlfriends, wives and mothers. Female athletes were often included in gag stories that involved sexual dialogue or emphasized their bodies. In Australia, the wives of the men's cricket team members were given more media coverage than the players on the women's cricket team, who also had won more games than the men's rugby team. In 2009, SportsCenter broadcast segments called "Her Story", which was a commentary that highlighted women's athletic careers.

In newspapers articles, coverage on men's sports once again had a greater number of articles than women's sports in a ratio of 23–1. In 1990, a study was conducted that recorded and compared the amount of media coverage of men and women's sports on popular newspapers. They analyzed four different sports magazines for three months and recorded the number of women's sports stories that were featured and the content of the stories. Women's sports made up 3.5%, compared to the 81% of men's coverage. The lengths of these articles were 25–27% shorter than the length of men's articles. There was an international frenzy in 2012 when the first woman that represented Saudi Arabia in the 2012 Olympics competed in track. That was the most women's sports coverage that there had been in several years. Women played 90 minutes of football, 80 minutes of rugby, 18 holes of golf and ran the same distance in a marathon as men. Exactly 12 months later, the newspapers returned to featuring 4% of articles on women's sports. This same trend can be seen with regards to the FIFA World Cup. The 2015 Women's World Cup Final had an average of 25.4 million American viewers throughout the duration of the match, and peaked at 30.9 million viewers. It was the most-viewed game of soccer ever in the United States–men's or women's–by a margin of almost 7 million viewers. Despite this jump in viewership of women's soccer in the U.S., television broadcasting of the women's professional soccer league in the U.S. remained much lower than that of the men's league. Fox Sports Network (the company that owns the rights to broadcast the National Women's Soccer League) broadcast 3 regular season NWSL games and 34 Major League Soccer regular-season games during the 2016 seasons. The dearth of coverage of women's sports is evidenced by the low number of segments (i.e., stories) in our sample. Of the 934 local network affiliate news segments (over 12 hr of broadcasts), 880 were on men's sports (or approximately 11½ hr), 22 segments (or nearly 18 min) were on gender-neutral sports (e.g., a horse race, coverage of the Los Angeles [LA] marathon, and a recreational sports event), and only 32 segments (about 23 min) featured women's sports. SportsCenter's numbers were similar. Of the 405 total SportsCenter segments in our sample (nearly 14 hr), 376 covered men's sports (slightly over 13 hr), 16 segments were on gender-neutral sports (just over 20 min), and only 13 segments featured women's sports (approximately 17 min).

A recent article from the Wall Street Journal states "from 2016 to 2018, women's games generated about $50.8 million in revenue compared with $49.9 million for the men, according to U.S. soccer's audited financial statements" (Bachman, 2019). These numbers contrasts the idea that women's sports are not entertaining enough for the viewer or typical fan by $1.9 million. This idea stems from the male dominated sports perspective, which constantly undermines the perception of quality, effort, and potential that women's soccer exhibits. However, we can see through the caliber of women's soccer displayed most recently within the Women's FIFA World Cup of 2019 that it was on par if not better than the level of play of their male counterparts. The U.S. Women's National Team scored 13 goals against Thailand in their opening match, the most goals scored in any World Cup match in history. Media outlets though may remain concerned that increased coverage of women's sport will lead to a reduction in audience draw and advertising revenue.

Amy Godoy-Pressland conducted a study that investigated the relationship between sports reporting and gender in Great Britain. She studied Great Britain's newspapers from January 2008 to December 2009 and documented how media coverage of men's sports and women's sports was fairly equal during the Olympics and then altered after the Olympics were over. "Sportswomen are disproportionately under-represented and the sheer quantity and quality of news items on sportsmen demonstrates how male athletes are represented as dominant and superior to females." She also documented how women's bodies were sexualized in photographs and written coverage, noting that the women featured were either nude, semi-nude, or wearing revealing clothing. "The sexualization of sportswomen in Sunday reporting is commonplace and aimed at the mostly male readership. It promotes the idea of female aesthetics over achievements, while the coverage of women not directly involved in sport misrepresents the place of women in sport and inferiorizes real sportswomen's achievements." The media has the ability to create or prevent interest in women's sports. Excluding women's sports from the media makes it much less likely for young girls to have role models that are women athletes. According to Tucker Center for Research on Girls & Women in Sport at the University of Minnesota 40% of all athletes in the United States are women but women's sports only receive about 4% of sports media coverage. This amount of coverage has decreased in the last 20 years although there has been a major increase in women athletes.

Media coverage has slightly increased and this is mostly due to social networking. Social media has further exposed women sports out to the public world, and often at a much greater rate than traditional news media. Traditional media has also improved its coverage of women's sports through more exposure time and using better equipment to record the events. Recent research has shown that in the past twenty years, camera angles, slow motion replays, quality and graphics regarding the presentation of women sports has gradually improved. However, mainstream media still is far behind in its showcasing of female sports in comparison to that of men's. A study has shown that ESPN, which began airing women NCAA tournament in 2003, aired eleven women tournament segments in comparison to one-hundred men's tournament segments. ESPN and other sports outlets are airing more female-oriented sporting events; however the length of the segments are very small. This representative data is showcases a main part of the minimal interaction the media has with women athletes. Media coverage of women sports in the United States has further justified the divisional hierarchy faced by women athletes in terms of popularity and coverage. Scholarly studies (Kane, M. J., LaVoi, N. M., Fink, J. S. (2013) also show that when women athletes were given the option to pick a photo of a picture that would increase respect for their sport, they picked an on-the-court competency picture. However, when women athletes were told to pick a picture that would increase interest in their sport, 47% picked a picture that sexualized the women athlete. The UK is more representative than the United States with the BBC giving women's sports about 20% of their sports coverage (BBC spokesperson). Many women athletes in the UK do not see this as adequate coverage for the 36% of women who participate in sports. NewsChain is the first commercial publisher totally dedicated to women's sport coverage based in the UK.

It is shown that only 5 percent of sports coverage on Sports Center is of women sport.

Sports equipment for girls and women 

Sports equipment designed for the female body is a more recent development in women's and girl's sport. Historically, men's organized sport develops first, often leaving girls and women with the only option of using equipment originally designed for the male body, a common practice to this day. Over time these practices have revealed sports equipment can present design issues for female participants, particularly for those whose participation continues after the onset of puberty. Typically, anatomical differences between male and female bodies do not receive first consideration during the first stage of equipment design since the male body often serves as the base model due to the predominance of male participants and market demand. Women and girls will often use equipment designed for smaller men, or even boys. In some sports these differences are not adversely significant, but can be so in the case of others. Sports equipment can create sizing issues for girls and women and can also affect performance, enjoyment and satisfaction. Designers can also fail to develop equipment made to protective sensitive areas such as female genitalia and the chest area.

Sports bra 
One important recent development is the sports bra. Commercially available sports bras first came to market in the 1970s.

Female genital protection
Some sports require female players wear a type of female genital protection. The female equivalent of the male jockstrap is the pelvic protector, essentially a jockstrap for females, known colloquially called a "jill" or "jillstrap".

The Thoren Theory 
The recent increase in female participation in sport and the problems female athletes can encounter has been highlighted in the sport of skiing. The "Thoren Theory", is named after USA National Ski champion, Jeannie Thoren, noted for her mantra, "Women are not small men". Thoren is also a member of the U.S. Ski & Snowboard Hall of Fame.

Sex-specific sports injuries 

There are some common sports injuries for which female athletes may be at a higher risk than male athletes.

Female Athlete Triad (RED-S) 

One area of interest involves studying the female athlete triad,  "Relative energy deficiency in sport", (RED-S).

Knee injuries 

Several studies have shown that female athletes are more likely to tear their anterior cruciate ligaments (ACLs) than male athletes. According to Dr. William Levine, director of sports medicine at Columbia University and the head physician for its varsity teams, female athletes are four or five times more likely than male athletes to have ACL tears.

There are several different theories about why women are more prone to this injury, including the "Q theory" which highlights specific differences in male and female anatomy and kinesiology. The difference in injury risk may be due to female-specific hormonal changes associated with the menstrual cycle, or due to different skeletal and muscular structures (like a wider pelvis, stronger quadriceps than hamstrings, or more elastic ligaments) that cause women to place more stress on and more easily stretch the ACL than men.

Concussions 
Female athletes are also more prone to concussions than male athletes. They exhibit more visible symptoms of a concussion than male athletes and for a longer period of time than male athletes, a phenomenon known as the "concussion gap". However, there is no consensus on the reason women are more prone to concussions than men or experience symptoms differently. Some theories have been that women have smaller, more breakable nerve fibers in their brains, that their necks are weaker and so their brains accelerate more sharply on impact, or fluctuating hormones during menstrual cycles that make them more susceptible.

Further reading
Dong Jinxia: Women, Sport and Society in Modern China: Holding Up More Than Half the Sky, Routledge, 2002, 
Allen Guttmann: Women's Sports: A History, Columbia University Press 1992, 
Helen Jefferson Lenskyj: Out of Bounds: Women, Sport and Sexuality.  Women's Press, 1986.
Helen Jefferson Lenskyj: Out on the Field: Gender, Sport and Sexualities.  Women's Press, 2003.
The Nation: Sports Don't Need Sex To Sell – NPR, Mary Jo Kane – August 2, 2011
 Else Trangbaek & Arnd Krüger (eds.): Gender and Sport from European Perspectives. Copenhagen: University of Copenhagen 1999
 LaVoi, N. M., McGarry, & J. E., Fisher, L. A. (2019). Final thoughts on women in sport coaching: Fighting the war. Women's Sport & Physical Activity Journal, 27(2), 136–140.

See also

 Women's professional sports
 Mixed-sex sports
Sportswear
Sex verification in sports
 Timeline of women's sports
 Women's Sports Foundation
 Major women's sport leagues in North America
 WTSN (TV channel)
 Misogyny in sports
 Participation of women in the Olympics
 Sportswear (activewear)
 Legends Football League
 Cheerleading
 Women in WWE
 Janet Guthrie

References

Sources
 https://www.irishtimes.com/student-hub/tackling-gender-barriers-to-sporting-equality-1.2619267

External links

 History of Women in Sports Timeline
 Heraea Games

 
Sports by type